"One Heart" is a song recorded by Canadian singer Celine Dion, for her eight English studio album, One Heart (2003). It was written and produced by John Shanks and Kara DioGuardi. "One Heart" is a dance-pop song, about the power of love. It was released on 16 June 2003 as the second single outside North America, while in Canada, it was released as the third single after "Have You Ever Been in Love". "One Heart" became a top 40 single in most European countries, including number 27 in the United Kingdom.

The song received favorable reviews from music critics, who deemed it "catchy" and picked as one of the best tracks on the album. The music video for "One Heart" was directed by Antti Jokinen and released on 30 May 2003. It was included on the UK enhanced double A-side single "One Heart/I Drove All Night". The making of the video was shown on the A New Day... Live in Las Vegas bonus DVD, called One Year...One Heart. In October 2008, it was included on the European version of Dion's My Love: Ultimate Essential Collection greatest hits.

Background and release
On 15 April 2003, it was announced that after the success of "I Drove All Night," two new singles from 'One Heart' were set to impact radio. In the United States and Canada, the ballad "Have You Ever Been in Love" was selected as the next single. In Europe, the upbeat title-track "One Heart" was chosen instead. On 17 June 2003, it was announced that the song was getting some serious airplay around the world and that "One Heart" was added to radio playlists in Europe and was gaining ground at Canadian radio. The CD single for "One Heart" was available in record stores in Europe around June 2003. The track listing includes remixes of the track. The song was released in October 2003 in Japan, while it was released as a double a-side single along with "I Drove All Night", on 8 September 2003 in the UK, becoming Dion's first double a-side release in the UK.

Composition

"One Heart" was composed and produced by John Shanks and Kara Dioguardi. It is an upbeat, dance-pop song, which draws from club-friendly house anthems, about the power of love and how determination and support can help a person through their problems. Keyboards, resembling the twinkling beats of a music box, begin the single. As it shortly plays, Dion says "one heart you are following". In the beginning, she advises to look on the bright side, with lyrics such as, "When you're down, you can start again/ Turn around anything you're in/ Love will find a place yeah". In the chorus, she says if they let their hearts lead them, they will be able to stay focused on their dream. ("If you got one heart you are followin'/One dream keeps you wondering/Love lights your way through the night/One wish keeps you tryin'/What's your silver lining/Loves lights your way through the night".) A jaunty acoustic guitar and equally cheerful drums accompany Dion in the bridge. She stresses that people have to have a dream to believe in, in lines like, "Everybody needs something to hold on to". Towards the end, she begins to wail a bit and extending some notes. At the end, she quietly says "love will find a way/love will find a way in your heart".

Critical reception
This song received favourable reviews. AllMusic senior editor Stephen Thomas Erlewine wrote that "the song is sunny and catchy" and picked it as one of the best tracks on the album. A very positive review came from Traveling to the Heart reviewer, who went to comment about her voice, stating: "Dion is low-key and mostly melisma-free. She sings in her lower register throughout the entire time. The change reveals her voice to be pleasing but bland and mechanical. " The reviewer concluded the analysis, writing: "The genial 'One Heart' is well-intentioned advice set to a paint-by-numbers, riskless dance beat". Acclaim came from Billboard: "Dion is particularly strong on the percolating title cut (a vibrant, infectious future hit helmed by Kara DioGuardi and John Shanks)". Jam!'s Darryl Sterdan wrote negatively that the song is "a blatant Shania soundalike".

Commercial performance

The song became a top forty hit in most European countries that it charted. In Austria, "One Heart" debuted at number 48 on the Ö3 Austria Top 40, on 29 June 2003. Later, the song jumped to number 27, cracking the top forty. However, the song fell to number 37 the following week, but it climbed to number 25, its peak position, in its fourth week. The song spent another 6 weeks inside the top forty, before falling to number 46. It spent 14 weeks on the chart. In Sweden, the song debuted at number 43 on the Swedish Singles Chart, on 26 June 2003. The song climbed to number 42, in its second week, while it reached number 40, on 11 July 2003. However, the song dropped the Swedish charts the following week, only returning on 8 August 2003, at number 60. Curiously, the song also dropped the chart the following week, only returning on 7 November 2003, at number 34, its peak position. The following and last week, the song left the chart at number 38.

In France, it debuted and peaked at number 63 on the SNEP chart. Although it not reached higher position, the song kept falling and climbing for 11 weeks, spending a total of 12 weeks inside the chart. In the UK, the song entered the UK Singles Chart at number 27, on 20 September 2003. It fell to number 57, on 29 September 2003, dropping the chart and spending only two consecutive weeks there. "One Heart" debuted and peaked at number 30 on the Irish Singles Chart, for the week ending 11 September 2003. It fell to number 44 the following week, while it dropped to number 49, in its third week, leaving the charts and spending three weeks inside the Irish chart.

Music video
Dion filmed the music video back-to-back with the "Have You Ever Been in Love" video in Los Angeles on 29 and 30 April 2003, with director Antti Jokinen. On 7 June, "TeamCeline" members got an exclusive preview of the music video on her official website. On 22 June 2003, both videos were released. The video shows Dion dancing and having fun at a club, where many people are also dancing to the song and it also features the singer Melissa Molinaro as the girl kissing her boyfriend at the bar.

Track listing and formats

European CD single
"One Heart" (Album Version) – 3:24
"One Heart" (Original 3 Pop Edit) – 3:20

European, Australian and Japanese CD maxi-single
"One Heart" (Album Version) – 3:24
"One Heart" (Original 3 Pop Edit) – 3:20
"One Heart" (Original 3 Rhythmic Extended) – 7:08
"One Heart" (Original 3 Rhythmic Edit) – 3:38

UK CD single #1
"One Heart" – 3:24
"I Drove All Night" – 4:00
"All by Myself" – 5:12
"One Heart" (Video) – 3:25

UK CD single #2
"One Heart" – 3:24
"I Drove All Night" – 4:00
"I Drove All Night" (Hex Hector Extended Vocal Import Mix) – 7:53
"I Drove All Night" (Video) – 3:58

Charts

Weekly charts

Year-end charts

Credits and personnel
Recording locations
Recording - Henson Studios (Los Angeles, California)
 Digital Insight (Los Angeles, California)

Personnel
Songwriting –  John Shanks, Kara DioGuardi
Production –  John Shanks, Kara DioGuardi
Mixing  - John Shanks, Jeff Rothschild
Guitars  - Shanks
Keyboards - Jamie Muhoberad
Bass  - Chris Chaney
Backing Vocals  - Kara Dioguardi

Credits adapted from the liner notes of One Heart, Epic Records.

Release history

References

Celine Dion songs
2003 singles
Song recordings produced by John Shanks
Songs written by Kara DioGuardi
Songs written by John Shanks
2003 songs
Columbia Records singles
Epic Records singles